The Ministry of Defence of the Republic of Somaliland (MoD)  is a member of the Somaliland cabinet and the head of the Ministry of Defence. responsible for implementing the defence policy set by Government of Somaliland and directs the activity of the Ministry. The Defence Minister exercises day-to-day administrative and operational authority over the armed forces.
The current Minister of Defence is Abdiqani Mohamoud Aateye.

History
In 1914, the Somaliland Camel Corps was formed in the British Somaliland protectorate and saw service before, during, and after the Italian invasion of the territory during World War II.

Army

Personnel
The sub of Somaliland army İn Somaliland has long operated without a formal rank structure. However, in December 2012, Somaliland defense ministry announced that a chain of command had been developed and would be implemented by January 2013.

Ministers of Defence

See also
 Somaliland National Armed Forces
 Nuh Ismail Tani
 Politics of Somaliland

References

External links
Official Site of the Government of Somaliland

Government of Somaliland
Organizations established in 1991
Politics of Somaliland
Government ministries of Somaliland